Adenochloa is a genus of flowering plants belonging to the family Poaceae.

Its native range is Tropical and Southern Africa, Madagascar.

Species:
 Adenochloa adenophora (K.Schum.) Zuloaga 
 Adenochloa bullockii (Renvoize) Zuloaga

References

Poaceae
Poaceae genera